Frederick Henry Alexander Forth (11 February 1808 – 1876) was a British colonial administrator. He was Lieutenant-Governor in the British West Indies, Colonial Treasurer of Hong Kong and magistrate of Tasmania.

Forth was born on 11 February 1808 to diplomat Nathaniel Parker Forth and Eliza Petrie. He was an army officer and Lieutenant-Governor in the British West Indies for some six years, where he was sent to initiate a government on the separation of those islands from the Bahamas. He was the Council President of the Turks and Caicos from 1848 to 1854. He was also the Colonial Treasurer of Hong Kong and ex officio member of the Legislative Council of Hong Kong. He was a captain in the Scots Fusiliers and was appointed by Governor Sir George Arthur in the first visiting magistracy created in Tasmania. He prepared the first code of standing regulations for the management of some thousands of European convicts employed upon the public works and roads of the colony.

Forth married Caroline Jemima Sherson. He died in Tasmania in 1876. His daughter Edith Ann Mary Forth married Phineas Ryrie. Through his son Robert De Lancey Forth, Forth's great-great-grandson is Australian-American media mogul Rupert Murdoch.

References

1808 births
1876 deaths
Financial Secretaries of Hong Kong
Government officials of Hong Kong
Members of the Legislative Council of Hong Kong
Royal Scots Fusiliers officers
Council Presidents of the Turks and Caicos Islands